Sidecluster milkweed may refer to two different species of plants:

 Asclepias lanuginosa
 Asclepias oenotheroides